The Đà Lạt Plateau (also called Lâm Viên Plateau, Lang Biang Plateau)  is a plateau in southeastern Vietnam. At its centre is the city of Da Lat.

Avifauna
The plateau has been designated as an Endemic Bird Area by BirdLife International. The plateau comprises a multitude of habitats for birds. Restricted-range species such as the Vietnamese crested argus (Rheinardia ocellata), short-tailed scimitar babbler (Jabouilleia danjoui), black-hooded laughingthrush (Garrulax milleti), white-cheeked laughingthrush (Garrulax vassali), collared laughingthrush (Garrulax yersini), grey-crowned crocias (crocias langbianis) and yellow-billed nuthatch (Sitta solangiae) inhabit the tropical montane broadleaf evergreen forest, the notable exception being the Vietnamese greenfinch (Carduelis monguilloti), which prefers pine forest. The varying altitudes in the plateau also form a congenial environment for birds that are suited to low altitude (up to 1,650 m) such as the black-hooded laughingthrush and the grey-crowned crocias, which rarely ventures above 1,450 m, while the collared laughingthrush often inhabits the higher peaks of the region, reaching above 1,500 m.

Mammals
The Bidoup Núi Bà National Park, which is located in the northeastern section of the Đà Lạt Plateau, contains a significant number of mammalian species, totaling some 36 species of small mammals. Some of the notable creatures in this total include treeshrews (Tupaiidae), roundleaf bats (Hipposideridae), horseshoe bats (Rhinolophidae), squirrels (Sciuridae), bamboo rats (Spalacidae) and porcupines (Hystricidae).

Weather
Đà Lạt Plateau is known for its mild and constant temperatures, which vary very slightly throughout the year. The average temperature in April, the warmest month, is 26.3 °C.January, the coldest month, sees an average temperature of 10.5 °C. October is the wettest month of the year.

References

Landforms of Vietnam
Plateaus of Asia
Landforms of Lâm Đồng province